The Women's U23 road race at the 2006 World University Cycling Championship took place on 23 March 2006. The Championships were hosted by the Belgian city of Antwerp. The race consisted of 2 laps on a 6.8 km long circuit (13.4 km). In the race participated 23 athletes from 13 countries representing 3 continents.

The Dutch women's Loes Gunnewijk and Ellen van Dijk won gold and silver in the time trial leaving the silver to Verena Jooss from Germany.

Final classification

DNF = did not finish

See also

2006 World University Cycling Championship – Women's road race

References

External links
International University Sports Federation – Cycling

World University Cycling Championships
2006 in women's road cycling
Cycling